Tyler Benson (born March 15, 1998) is a Canadian professional ice hockey forward. He is currently playing for the Bakersfield Condors in the American Hockey League (AHL) as a prospect to the Edmonton Oilers of the National Hockey League (NHL).

Playing career
Benson was selected first overall by the Vancouver Giants in the 2013 WHL Bantam Draft and played for them from 2013 to 2018.

Benson played bantam hockey within the Alberta Major Bantam Hockey League (AMBHL) where during the 2012–13 season he established a new scoring record with 146 points in 33 games, surpassing the previous mark of 131 points held by Ty Rattie. In addition to being the league's top scorer, he was also named the AMBHL North's Most Valuable Player for the 2012–13 season.

The Vancouver Giants selected Benson with the 1st overall pick in the 2013 WHL Bantam Draft and, as an underaged player, he made his WHL debut on November 16, 2013. He was selected by the Edmonton Oilers in the 2016 NHL Entry Draft in the second round, 32nd overall and signed an entry level contract on December 30, 2016. He turned pro in the 2018–19 season, playing with the Bakersfield Condors of the American Hockey League. Benson was named to the AHL All-Rookie and Second All-Star teams in the 2018–19 season, and played in the 2019–20 season All-Star game.

Career statistics

Regular season and playoffs

International

Awards and honours

References

External links 

1998 births
Living people
Bakersfield Condors players
Canadian ice hockey left wingers
Edmonton Oilers draft picks
Edmonton Oilers players
GCK Lions players
Ice hockey people from Edmonton
Vancouver Giants players